Um Tae-hwa (born 1980) is a South Korean film director and screenwriter. Um's directorial feature debut Ingtoogi: The Battle of Internet Trolls (2013)—a graduation project for the Korean Academy of Film Arts (KAFA)—was nominated for Best Film, Best Director and Best New Director at the 1st Wildflower Film Awards and Best New Director (Film) at the 50th Baeksang Arts Awards in 2014.

Personal life
His younger brother is Uhm Tae-goo, a South Korean actor known for his roles in many critically acclaimed films, such as Coin Locker Girl (2015) and The Age of Shadows (2016) and for his main roles in popular Korean dramas, such as Save Me 2 (2019), Hometown (2021) and Dr. Brain (2021-present).

Filmography 
The Story About Sun-hee (2002) – director 
Cactus (short film, 2003) – director, screenwriter, producer, editor, storyboard
Three... Extremes (2004) – directing department
Sympathy for Lady Vengeance (2005) – assistant director
The Faces (2006) – actor
Epitaph (2007) – assistant director
Night Fishing (2011) – assistant director, storyboard
Nice Shorts! 2011 (segment: "Home Sweet Home") (2011) – director, screenwriter
Forest (short film, 2012) – director
Heart Vibrator (short film, 2012) – director, screenwriter,
Ingtoogi: The Battle of Internet Trolls (2013) – director, screenwriter, editor
Manshin: Ten Thousand Spirits (2014) – storyboard, scripter
Tinker Ticker (2014) – actor
The Wicked (2014) – storyboard
Socialphobia (2015) – Cinematography department
Vanishing Time: A Boy Who Returned (2016) – director
Concrete Utopia (2021) – director

References

External links 
 
 
 

1980 births
Living people
People from Seoul
South Korean film directors
South Korean screenwriters